Willard Rouse Jillson (May 28, 1890 – October 4, 1975) was a Kentucky historian, academic, and geologist who authored numerous books on Kentucky politicians and geology matters pertaining to the State.

Jillson taught geology in Lexington at the University of Kentucky in 1918 and later at Transylvania University in 1947.  He served in various government positions, notably as Kentucky State Geologist and director of the Sixth Kentucky Geological Survey.

He died in 1975 and was buried in the Frankfort Cemetery in Frankfort, Kentucky.

External links
 
Willard Rouse Jillson Papers, 1898-1978, housed at Berea College Special Collections and Archives
Guide to the Willard Rouse Jillson A Bibliography of the Cumberland River Valley manuscript, housed at the University of Kentucky Libraries Special Collections Research Center
Guide to the Willard Rouse Jillson A Bibliography of Powell County Kentucky manuscript, housed at the University of Kentucky Libraries Special Collections Research Center
Guide to the Willard Rouse Jillson Geology of the Mintonville Dome manuscript, housed at the University of Kentucky Libraries Special Collections Research Center
Guide to the Willard ROuse Jillson Geology of the Pitman Oil Pool in Kentucky manuscript, housed at the University of Kentucky Libraries Special Collections Research Center

1890 births
1975 deaths
Burials at Frankfort Cemetery
Writers from Kentucky
20th-century American geologists
University of Kentucky faculty
Transylvania University faculty